Granville Ferry  is a village in the Canadian province of Nova Scotia, located in  Annapolis County. Granville Ferry is located directly across the Annapolis River from Annapolis Royal, Nova Scotia. It was the northern terminus for ferries running across the river. Granville Ferry was a major shipbuilding centre in the Golden Age of Sail. The village was also home to Bessie Hall, a notable female mariner in the 19th century. The community is named after John Carteret, 2nd Earl Granville. Its population at the 2021 census was 152, an increase of 38.2% since 2016.

Demographics 

References

Communities in Annapolis County, Nova Scotia
Designated places in Nova Scotia